Like You Do... Best of The Lightning Seeds is the first greatest hits album by English alternative rock band The Lightning Seeds, released on 10 November 1997. The album includes the band's singles from 1989 up until the album's release, plus two previously unreleased tracks and one new version of a song from a previous studio album. "What You Say" was released as a single from the album on 1 December 1997 and peaked at #41 in the UK Singles Chart.

Track listing

Charts and certifications

Weekly charts

Year-end charts

Certifications

References

The Lightning Seeds albums
Albums produced by Ian Broudie
1997 greatest hits albums
Epic Records compilation albums